Dalithoy or daali toy is very simple and healthy soup made with split yellow lentils in the Malvani cuisine of the Konkan region of India. Daali is the Konkani word for daal or lentil.

History
Dalithoy or daali toy is quite simple and healthy soup made with split yellow lentils in the Malvani cuisine of the Konkan region of India . Daali is the Konkani word for daal or lentil.

References

External links
 Daali Toy recipe at AmchiRecipes.com

Konkani cuisine
Karnataka cuisine